The 2006–07 George Washington Colonials men's basketball team represented George Washington University in the 2006–07 NCAA Division I men's basketball season. The Colonials, led by head coach Karl Hobbs, played their home games at the Charles E. Smith Center in Washington, D.C., as members of the Atlantic 10 Conference. After finishing 3rd in the conference regular season standings, the Colonials won the Atlantic 10 tournament to earn an automatic bid to the NCAA tournament as the 11th seed in the East region. George Washington was beaten by 6th seed Vanderbilt in the first round, 77–44.

Roster 

Source

Schedule and results

|-
!colspan=12 style=|Regular season

|-
!colspan=12 style=| Atlantic 10 tournament

|-
!colspan=12 style=| NCAA tournament

Source

References

George Washington Colonials men's basketball seasons
George Washington
George Washington
George Washington Colonials men's basketball
George Washington Colonials men's basketball